Centronics Data Computer Corporation was an American manufacturer of computer printers, now remembered primarily for the parallel interface that bears its name, the Centronics connector.

History

Foundations 
Centronics began as a division of Wang Laboratories.  Founded and initially operated by Robert Howard (president) and Samuel Lang (vice president and owner of the well known K & L Color Photo Service Lab in New York City), the group produced remote terminals and systems for the casino industry.  Printers were developed to print receipts and transaction reports.  Wang spun off the business in 1971 and Centronics was formed as a corporation in Hudson, New Hampshire with Howard as president and chairman.

The Centronics Model 101 was introduced at the 1970 National Computer Conference in May. The print head used an innovative seven-wire solenoid impact system.  Based on this design, Centronics later developed the first dot matrix impact printer (while the first such printer was the OKI Wiredot in 1968).

Howard developed a personal relationship with his neighbor, Max Hugel, the founder and president of Brother International, the United States arm of Brother Industries, Ltd., a manufacturer of sewing machines and typewriters.  A business relationship developed when Centronics needed reliable manufacturing of the printer mechanisms—a relationship that would help propel Brother into the printer industry.  Hugel would later become executive vice president of Centronics.  Print heads and electronics were built in Centronics plants in New Hampshire and Ireland, mechanisms were built in Japan by Brother and the printers were assembled in New Hampshire.

In the 1970s, Centronics formed a relationship with Canon to develop non-impact printers.  No products were ever produced, but Canon continued to work on laser printers, eventually developing a highly successful series of engines.

In 1977, Centronics sued competitor Mannesmann AG in a patent dispute regarding the return spring used in the print actuator.

In 1975, Centronics formed an OEM agreement with Tandy and produced DMP and LP series printers for several years.  The 6000 series band printers were introduced in 1978.  By 1979 company revenues were over $100 million.

In 1980, the Mini-Printer Model 770 was introduced—a small, low-cost desktop serial matrix printer.  This was the first printer built completely in-house, and there were problems.  Flaws in the microprocessor led to a recall and a stoppage of manufacturing for a year.  During this period, Epson, Brother and others began to gain market share and Centronics never recovered.  1980 also saw the introduction of the E Series 900 and 1200 LPM band printers.

Change of ownership 

In 1982, Control Data Corporation merged their current printer business unit, CPI, into Centronics and at the same time invested $25 million in the company, effectively taking control from Howard. During 1980-1985 the company lost $80 million. 

Control Data controlled the company until 1986 when CDC's interest was acquired by a group of investors affiliated with Drexel Burnham Lambert.  The Drexel interest was acquired by Centronics in 1987.

The LineWriter 400 band printer was introduced in 1983, closely followed by the faster LineWriter 800 band printer in 1984.  The LineWriter series would continue through 1995.  The GLP (Great Little Printer) was a series of low-end serial matrix printers introduced in 1984.

The relationship with Brother continued with several of the PrintStation models being produced from rebadged Brother products. Exclusive rights to market Trilog color matrix printers was acquired in 1984, and Trilog was purchased outright in 1985.  Advanced Terminals (a manufacturer of sheet feeders) and BDS Computer Australia Pty Ltd were purchased in 1986.

The PrintStation 350 series serial matrix printer was highly successful in the OEM market, sold with the logos of Data General, ITT Courier, NCR, CDC, Decision Data and ISI.  Most profitable was the agreement to build the IBM 4214 based on a modified PS350.  In 1985, company revenues were $126 million with $65 million from IBM 4214 production.  In 1986 the IBM 4214 production ended and revenue dropped.

On June 23, 1986, Centronics announced the new corporate logo. The new logo never gained recognition before the sale to GENICOM, and GENICOM used the old logo in continued sales of printers and supplies.

The only Centronics laser product was released in July 1986: the PagePrinter 8.  The PP8 used a Sharp engine identical to an existing Sharp copier, using a 6800 based controller jointly developed by Sharp and Centronics.  At $2,495, the PP8 was $500 less than the HP LaserJet.  A faster version was announced, but never materialized.

Printer division sale 
In 1987 the Centronics printer business was sold to GENICOM for $87 million. Centronics Data Computer Corporation continued as a New York Stock Exchange company and soon changed its name to Centronics Corporation in 1987.  After using the proceeds of the sale to purchase Ekco Housewares in 1988 for $125 million, Centronics changed their name to Ekco Group, Inc.

Centronics 101
The Centronics 101 (introduced 1970) was highly innovative and affordable at its inception.  Some selected specifications:
 Print speed: 165 characters per second
 Weight: 155 pounds (70.3 kg)
 Size: 27 ½ " W x 11 ¼ " H x 19 ¼ D (~ 70 cm x 29 cm x 49 cm)
 Shipping: 200 pounds (ca 91 kg), wooden crate, unpacked by removal of 36 screws
 Characters: 62, 10 numeric, 26 upper case and 26 special characters (no lower case)
 Character size: 10 characters per inch
 Line spacing: 6 lines per inch
 Vertical control: punched tape reader for top of form and vertical tab
 Forms thickness: original plus four copies
 Interfaces: Centronics parallel, optional RS-232 serial

Legacy 

The connectors developed for its parallel interface live on as the "Centronics connector", used in other computer hardware applications, notably as the printer end of the once ubiquitous parallel-printer cable.

References

Further reading 

Robert Howard, Connecting the Dots: My Life and Inventions, From X-rays to Death Rays, Welcome Rain Publishers, July 16, 2009.  
Edward Webster, Print Unchained: Fifty Years of Digital Printing, 1950-2000 and Beyond, DRA of Vermont, Inc. (2000).  
 Centronics Model 101 User Manual
 Datek Printer Report, July 1986
 PC Magazine, Nov 27, 1984

External links 
 Centronics data sheets

American companies established in 1971
American companies disestablished in 1987
Computer buses
Computer companies established in 1971
Computer companies disestablished in 1987
Computer printer companies
Control Data Corporation
Defunct companies based in New Hampshire
Defunct computer companies of the United States
Electronics companies established in 1971
Hudson, New Hampshire